Brush is a Statutory City located in Morgan County, Colorado, United States. The city population was 5,339 at the 2020 United States Census. Brush is a part of the Fort Morgan, CO Micropolitan Statistical Area.

History 
Brush, Colorado was named for Jared L. Brush, who was a Colorado cattle pioneer.  Brush had never lived in Brush, Colorado, instead helping to settle what is now known as Greeley. Brush later served as Lieutenant Governor of Colorado, and liked to visit "his town" often.

The town was incorporated by election in 1884.

Geography
Brush is located at  (40.2581366, -103.6321598).

At the 2020 United States Census, the city had a total area of  including  of water.

Climate
According to the Köppen Climate Classification system, Brush has a semi-arid climate, abbreviated "BSk" on climate maps.

Demographics

As of the census of 2000, there were 5,117 people, 1,836 households, and 1,233 families residing in the city. The racial makeup of the population in the city was 75.81% White, 0.39% African American, 0.51% Native American, 0.16% Asian, 0.04% Pacific Islander, 20.19% from other races, and 2.91% from two or more races. Hispanic or Latino of any race were 50.00% of the population.

There were 1,836 households, out of which 35.1% had children under the age of 18 living with them, 53.8% were married couples living together, 9.6% had a female householder with no husband present, and 32.8% were non-families. 28.6% of all households were made up of individuals, and 15.2% had someone living alone who was 65 years of age or older.  The average household size was 2.64 and the average family size was 3.29.

In the city, the population was spread out, with 28.3% under the age of 18, 8.5% from 18 to 24, 25.7% from 25 to 44, 18.7% from 45 to 64, and 18.8% who were 65 years of age or older.  The median age was 35 years. For every 100 females, there were 91.6 males.  For every 100 females age 18 and over, there were 88.3 males.

The median income for a household in the city was $31,333, and the median income for a family was $39,094. Males had a median income of $24,431 versus $20,371 for females. The per capita income for the city was $14,672.  About 5.4% of families and 10.4% of the population were below the poverty line, including 10.1% of those under age 18 and 13.1% of those age 65 or over.

Culture 
Agriculture and ranching make up a large part of the local economy. The Brush Rodeo, known as the largest amateur rodeo in the world, is held each July. The Morgan County Fair showcases the community's 4-H projects and livestock.

The Brush Industrial Park contains a 272-bed prison in a correctional complex that has been vacant since 2010. In 2017, plans were to use an outbuilding as a treatment center for autistic spectrum disorders.

The East Morgan County Library is located in Brush.

The city museum is housed in a former schoolhouse.

The Brush High School mascot is the Beetdigger, signifying the importance of the annual sugar beet crop. The football team, winner of multiple state championships, plays its games at Beetdigger Stadium.

Education

School District
Brush School District Re 2J

Elementary schools
Thomson Elementary School
•Address: 422 Ray Street

Beaver Valley Elementary School
•Address: 2710 Mill Street

Combined Secondary Campus
Brush Secondary Campus
•Address: 1600 Mill Street

Transportation

Major Highways
 Interstate 76 connects Brush to Denver, located 93 miles southwest. To the northeast, Brush is linked with Interstate 80 in Big Springs, Nebraska, via Sterling, Colorado.
 Business Loop 76 runs on Edison Street, reaching Fort Morgan in its west end.
 US 6 connects Provincetown, Massachusetts to Bishop, California, via Nevada, Colorado, Illinois and 9 other states.
 US 34 links Granby, Colorado with Berwyn, Illinois, passing through Nebraska and Iowa. In Colorado, it connects Brush to Greeley and Loveland.
 State Highway 71 runs from US 350, near La Junta to Nebraska state border, where it becomes Nebraska Highway 71.

Local notables 
Pat Day, 1992 Kentucky Derby winner and a member of the jockey Hall of Fame, was born in Brush.

See also

List of municipalities in Colorado

References

External links

City of Brush website
CDOT map of the City of Brush

Cities in Morgan County, Colorado
Cities in Colorado